Francesco Polazzo (1683–1753) was an Italian painter of the late-Baroque period, active mainly  in Venice. He was a pupil of Giovanni Battista Piazzetta, and painted  portraits and historical subjects, though  better known as a restorer of pictures. Lanzi said of him that he softened down the style of Piazzetta with that of Ricci.

References

 Lanzi, Luigi, The History of Painting in Italy: The school of Venice. Translated by Thomas Roscoe, 1828. Page 361.

External links

1683 births
1753 deaths
17th-century Italian painters
Italian male painters
18th-century Italian painters
Painters from Venice
Italian Baroque painters
18th-century Italian male artists